Gerald David "Jerry" Jennings (born July 31, 1948) is an American former politician from the state of New York who was the 74th mayor of Albany. A Democrat, Jennings won five terms as mayor of Albany and served in that capacity for 20 years.

Background and early career
Born in North Albany, Gerald "Jerry" Jennings began his career in the Albany City School District after graduating with a bachelor's degree from SUNY Brockport in 1970 and a Master of Science degree from the University at Albany in 1976.

Jennings served for 13 years on the Albany Common Council representing the 11th Ward.

Mayor of Albany
Jennings won an upset in the 1993 Democratic mayoral primary—the real contest in this heavily Democratic city—over Harold Joyce, who had the Democratic Party’s formal endorsement and had only recently been its chairman. He went on to win the general election, becoming the 74th mayor of Albany. Jennings was re-elected four times and retired as mayor at the end of 2013.

In a break from his party, Jennings endorsed George Pataki, a Republican, in the 2002 New York gubernatorial race. The mayor has also supported now-former U.S. Representative John E. Sweeney (R-Clifton Park). Jennings has been a strong proponent of the plan to build a convention center in downtown Albany. He hosted a call-in radio show on WGDJ every Friday from 9 a.m. to 10 a.m.

In 2006, Jennings was voted out of his position on the New York State Democratic Committee by state Assemblyman John McEneny. The mayor had served on the committee since 2002. This race was a rematch of the 1997 primary, when McEneny unsuccessfully challenged Jennings for the Democratic mayoral nomination.

The Albany Times Union reported on November 25, 2008 that Jennings would seek re-election for a fifth term in 2009. The story noted that "Safety in the city, with its youth violence and gun crimes, continues to mar Jennings' leadership and Albany's image." Jennings's opponent for the Democratic primary, Albany Common Council member Corey Ellis, announced his candidacy on March 2, 2009. (Common Council President Shawn Morris was originally also a candidate, but she dropped out over the summer.) Jennings won the primary, held on September 15, 2009, and went on to defeat Republican Nathan Lebron on November 3 in the general election.

Illegal guns
Jennings served as a member of the Mayors Against Illegal Guns Coalition, a bi-partisan group with a stated goal of "making the public safer by getting illegal guns off the streets." The Coalition was co-chaired by former Boston mayor Tom Menino and former New York City Mayor Michael Bloomberg.  Beginning in 2002, the Albany Police Department endured a scandal regarding illicitly purchased machine guns.

Parking ticket scandal
In November 2008, local media reported that for 15 years the Albany Police Department has engaged in an unapproved effort to avoid parking fines. It was alleged that an unofficial, secret system resulted in "zero fine" tickets being issued to an unknown number of local drivers who either had special windshield decals or were on VIP lists.  Both the New York State Comptroller's Office and the Albany Common Council investigated the practice, and the Albany Times Union made a request under the Freedom of Information Law to obtain more information about it.  New York State Comptroller Thomas DiNapoli's audit faulted the city for "lax oversight that allowed at least two informal systems for skirting parking fines to flourish."  In November 2009, Jennings denied that he knew of any abuses in regard to parking tickets, and also directed that the issuance of no-fine tickets be ceased.

Electoral history
2005 election for Mayor of Albany
 Gerald D. Jennings (D) (inc.), 68.6%
 Alice Green (G), 24.8%
 Joseph P. Sullivan (R), 6.5%
2006 election for New York State Democratic Committee
 John McEneny, 6,346
 Gerald D. Jennings, 5,589

2009 Democratic Primary for Mayor of Albany
 Gerald D. Jennings, 7,615
 Corey Ellis, 5,971

2009 election for Mayor of Albany.

 Gerald D. Jennings, 10,466
 Corey Ellis, 4,801
 Nathan LeBron 1,178

References

External links

 Mayor Gerald D. Jennings Biography at albanyny.org
 City of Albany home page 
 

1948 births
Living people
Mayors of Albany, New York
New York (state) Democrats
State University of New York at Brockport alumni
University at Albany, SUNY alumni
Albany, New York Common Council members
2012 United States presidential electors